Collonges-la-Rouge (literally Collonges the Red) is a commune in the Corrèze department in the Nouvelle-Aquitaine region of France.

History
The monks of Charroux Abbey founded a priory in the 8th century which attracted a population of peasants, craftsmen and tradesmen who lived and prospered around its fortified walls. The welcoming of pilgrims for Compostelle through Rocamadour was a lasting source of profit. In 1308, the viscount of Turenne granted the village a right to high, medium and low jurisdiction, permitting it to govern the birth of lineages of prosecutors, lawyers and notaries. The enclosure soon became too small to contain the entire population, and faubourgs were created. Following the French wars of religion, the reconstruction of the nobility's fortune coincided with the viscount's rise in power.

After selling the viscounty in 1738, and after the French Revolution which caused the destruction of the priory buildings, the village regained a short-lasting prosperity at the beginning of the 19th century. Later on, its population slowly decreased and the village was transformed into a stone quarry.

At the beginning of the 20th century, some villagers created the association Les Amis de Collonges (The Friends of Collonges) and eventually obtained the classification of the entire village as a historical monument in 1942.

Population

Its inhabitants are called Collongeois.

Sights
Collonges-la-Rouge is entirely built with red sandstone. Its existence is proven since the 8th century thanks to the donation of the count of Limoges of the parish to the monastery of Charroux.

The village is a member of the Les Plus Beaux Villages de France (The Most Beautiful Villages of France) association, and is actually where this association was created. It is one of the most visited sites in the Nouvelle-Aquitaine.

Civil architecture
The marketplaces date back to the 16th and 17th centuries, and the covered passage is listed as a historical monument.

Houses
Maison de la Sirène, possesses a vaulted porch and dates back to the 16th century. It belonged to Henry de Jouvenel, one of writer Colette's husbands. It is listed as a historical monument. A 3 franc postage stamp representing the Maison de la Sirène was issued on July 3, 1982
A priory, built in the 16th century, has been a historical monument since July 4, 1951 for its facade with balcony and its roof
the ancient sisters' house, built in the 16th century, has been a historical monument since July 4, 1951. Rue de la Barrière (Barrière Street)
16th-century Bonyt house is a historical monument for its facade, roof and spiral staircase;
Boutang du Peyrat house, with parts from the 15th, 16th and 17th centuries, is a historical monument. The protected elements are a window with preserved Louis XIII woodwork, a 17th-century entrance door, a wooden chimney, its facade and roof
16th-century Julliot house is a historical monument for its facade, roof and entrance stairs
Dey house is a historical monument
A 16th- and 18th-century house on the Place de la Halle is a historical monument for its facade, loggia, and roof
Poignet house has a 17th-century window listed as a historical monument.
Salvant et Vallat house is also a historical monument.

Official buildings
The ancient court of the Châtellerie (16th century) has been a historical monument since December 13, 1978
The ancient town hall (with parts from the 16th, 17th and 18th centuries) has its facade, roof, and stone chimney listed as national monuments since January 4, 1951

Castles, hotels and noble houses
Manoir de Vassinhac (14th and 16th centuries), with elements of fortifications, is a historical monument
Château or hôtel du Friac or de Beaurival (hôtel de Beaurival), 15th century, is a historical monument since December 17, 1926
Château de Benge, with parts from the 16th and 18th centuries, was listed as a historical monument by the orders of September 23, 1953 and March 18, 1954
Castel Maussac, 15th and 16th centuries, has been a historical monument since December 17, 1926
Château du Breuil
Château du Martret, with parts from the 16th and 19th centuries, is a historical monument
Manoir de Beauvirie, 16th century, is a historical monument
Château de Beauregard, 15th century, has been a historical monument since December 17, 1926

Military architecture
The fortified wall dates back to the 14th century. The doors of the ancient priory and of the church are both listed as historical monuments.

Religious art
The Saint-Pierre church, dating from the 11th, 12th and 15th centuries, with its romance curved steeple (one of the oldest of the Nouvelle-Aquitaine region), was fortified during the 16th-century French wars of religion. Its remarkable gates are decorated with a 12th-century tympanum carved in white stone (contrasting with the red stone of the rest of the village), representing the ascension of Christ dominating his mother and the 11 apostles. It was hidden during the wars of religion and only replaced in 1923.

The main altar, painted in blue and gold, is composed of a 19th-century altar, a partly 17th-century tier, an 18th-century tabernacle, and an altarpiece reconstructed in the 19th century with elements two centuries older. It was listed as a national treasure and restored in 1984-1985.

The altar (wooden and painted in gold) of the southern chapel represents the Passion and dates back to the end of the 17th century. It is also listed as a historical monument.

The wooden fence of the chapel, with a central turnstile, dating back around the turn of the 18th century, is decorated with coquilles, volutes and sculpted acanthus leaves. It is listed.

The 16th-century wooden statue of Christ, was discovered in 1971. It is a historical monument, with two other statues of the Virgin Mary, from the 17th or 18th century. A wooden Christ on the cross dates back to the 17th century, and is listed. The whole church has been a historical monument since 4 April 1905.

See also
Communes of the Corrèze department

References

Communes of Corrèze
Plus Beaux Villages de France